"Working Class Hero" is a song by John Lennon from his 1970 album John Lennon/Plastic Ono Band, his first album after the break-up of the Beatles.

Theme
Stridently political, the song is a commentary on the difference between social classes. According to Lennon, it is about working class people being processed into the middle classes, into the "machine". Lennon also said, "I think it's a revolutionary song – it's really just revolutionary. I just think its concept is revolutionary. I hope it's for workers and not for tarts and fags. I hope it's about what Give Peace a Chance was about. But I don't know – on the other hand, it might just be ignored. I think it's for the people like me who are working class, who are supposed to be processed into the middle classes, or into the machinery. It's my experience, and I hope it's just a warning to people, Working Class Hero."

The song continued a string of political Lennon recordings that began in 1968 with the Beatles' "Revolution" and continued in 1972 with the release of Some Time in New York City.

Recording and sound
Recorded at EMI Studios on 27 September 1970, the song features only Lennon, singing and playing an acoustic guitar as his backing. The chord progression is very simple, and builds on A-minor and G-major, with a short detour to D-major in one line of the chorus. Lennon's strumming technique includes a riff with a hammer-on pick of the E note on the D string and then an open A string. The tone and style of the song is similar to that of "Masters of War" and "North Country Blues" by Bob Dylan, a known influence of Lennon. Both are based on Jean Ritchie's arrangement of the traditional English folk song, "Nottamun Town". The recording is the composite of two different takes: the tone of the guitar and vocal changes between 1:24 and 1:45 for the verse "When they've tortured and scared you".

Reception
Classic Rock critic Rob Hughes rated "Working Class Hero" as Lennon's 4th best political song, saying that "The class wars provide the impetus for Lennon’s searing commentary on the repressive nature of institutional power."  Ultimate Classic Rock critic Nick DeRiso rated it as Lennon's 4th greatest solo political song, calling it "one of Lennon's most brutally frank and emotionally gripping moments."

Personnel
 John Lennon – vocals, acoustic guitar

Controversy
In 1973, US Representative Harley Orrin Staggers heard the song – which includes the lines "'Til you're so fucking crazy you can't follow their rules" and "But you're still fucking peasants as far as I can see" – on WGTB and lodged a complaint with the Federal Communications Commission (FCC). The manager of the station, Ken Sleeman, faced a year in prison and a $10,000 fine, but defended his decision to play the song saying, "The People of Washington DC are sophisticated enough to accept the occasional four-letter word in context, and not become sexually aroused, offended, or upset." The charges were dropped. Other US radio stations, like Boston's WBCN, banned the song for its use of the word "fucking". In Australia, the album was released with the expletive removed from the song and the lyrics censored on the inner sleeve.
(In the American release all of the lyrics to all of the songs on the album were printed clearly on the inner sleeve just as they were sung, including the word "fucking".)

References

1970 songs
2007 songs
1971 singles
2007 singles
1970s ballads
John Lennon songs
Songs critical of religion
Obscenity controversies in music
Songs written by John Lennon
Song recordings produced by Phil Spector
Song recordings produced by John Lennon
Song recordings produced by Yoko Ono
Manic Street Preachers songs
Folk ballads
Songs against capitalism
English folk songs
Mass media portrayals of the working class
Marilyn Manson (band) songs
Plastic Ono Band songs
Apple Records singles